Leach Nunatak is a nunatak  west-southwest of Mount Ronne in the Haines Mountains, Ford Ranges, Marie Byrd Land, Antarctica. It was mapped by the United States Antarctic Service (1939–41) and by the United States Geological Survey from surveys and U.S. Navy air photos (1959–65). The nunatak was named by the Advisory Committee on Antarctic Names for aviation electronics technician Edwin B. Leach, U.S. Navy, Williams Field Division Chief responsible for maintenance of electronic equipment on all aircraft during Operation Deep Freeze 1967.

References

Nunataks of Marie Byrd Land